Distraction is the second album by experimental rock outfit Bear Hands.

Track listing 

"Moment of Silence" (3:19)
"Giants" (3:08)
"Agora" (2:40)
"Bone Digger" (3:31)
"Vile Iowa" (2:55)
"Bad Friend" (2:51)
"The Bug" (3:29)
"Peacekeeper" (2:54)
"Sleeping on the Floor" (2:36)
"Party Hats" (4:59)
"Thought Wrong" (3:24)

Charts

References 

2014 albums
Bear Hands albums